Mijaci may refer to:

 Mijači, village in Croatia
 Mijaks, ethnographic group in the Republic of Macedonia